The CCCAN Championships are a biennial aquatics championship for countries in Central America and the Caribbean. The name of the event comes from the event's organizers: the Central American & Caribbean Swimming Confederation, whose abbreviated name is CCCAN.

The CCCAN Championships are held every odd year, and began in 1960. The 2013 CCCANs were originally awarded to Guatemala, however, in late 2012, the city announced it could not host the championships. In early 2013, San José, Costa Rica came forward to host the event.

In addition to CCCAN members, South American countries which border on the Caribbean have also participated in the championships, including Suriname, Colombia and Venezuela.

Participating countries
Countries invited to participate at the 2013 championships are:
27 CCCAN members
Colombia
Suriname
Venezuela
Guadeloupe & Martinique  (traditionally, these 2 oversees departments of France have competed as french team)

Championships

See also
List of Central American and Caribbean Championships records in swimming
Central American and Caribbean Games
South American Swimming Championships
Pan Pacific Swimming Championships

References

External links
CCCAN 2007 webpage
CCCAN 2018 webpage

International swimming competitions
Swimming in the Americas
Swimming in the Caribbean
Swimming in Central America
International sports competitions in Central America
Swimming competitions in the Americas
Central America and the Caribbean